Skill positions in gridiron football are the positions that ordinarily handle the ball and are most responsible for scoring points. Offensive players such as quarterbacks, running backs, and wide receivers are typically considered skill positions, as are tight ends on occasion.

Skill positions are contrasted with linemen and defensive players, which are generally considered to be positions heavily reliant on power and brute strength. Skill position players are often physically smaller than linemen, but they must also be faster and have other talents; such as the ability to throw accurately, handle or catch the ball under pressure, avoid tacklers, or read and exploit defensive weaknesses; which are less of a priority for linemen.

See also
Eligible receiver

References

American football positions